Mikołaj Kamieniecki h. Pilawa (1460 – 15 April 1515) was a Polish nobleman (szlachcic) and the first Great Hetman of the Crown.

Mikołaj was the oldest son of castellan of Sanok Henryk Kamieniecki and Katarzyna Pieniążkówna. He was owner of Węglówka, Kombornia, Wola Komborska, Jabłonica, Malinówka and the Kamieniec (ger. Erenberg) castle in Odrzykoń. A trusted co-worker of King Jan I Olbracht and Kazimierz Jagiellończyk.

He became castellan of Sandomierz, voivode of the Kraków Voivodship and was Great Hetman of the Crown from 1503 until 1515.

Mikołaj defeated Vlachs in the Battle of Czerniowce during the Moldavian campaign in 1509 and Turks in 1512 in the Battle of Łopuszno.

Marriage and issue 
Mikołaj married Anna Tarnowska-Melsztyńska h. Leliwa in ca. 1480 but remained childless.

Bibliography 
 Mikołaj Kamieniecki, Polski Słownik Biograficzny,  T. 11, s. 517

See also
Lublin Voivode

References

Secular senators of the Polish–Lithuanian Commonwealth
1460 births
1515 deaths
Lublin Voivodes
Mikolaj
Great Crown Hetmans
People from Krosno County